Donald Methuen Fleming,  (May 23, 1905 – December 31, 1986) was a Canadian parliamentarian, International Monetary Fund official and lawyer, born in Exeter, Ontario, Canada.

Life and career
Fleming was first elected to the House of Commons in the 1945 general election as a Progressive Conservative candidate in the Toronto riding of Eglinton. In 1948, he was a candidate in that year's Progressive Conservative leadership convention, losing to George Drew. He ran for the leadership again in the 1956 leadership convention, losing to John Diefenbaker.

The Speaker expelled Fleming from the House of Commons during the 1956 Pipeline Debate that helped lead to the defeat of the Liberal government of Louis St. Laurent in the 1957 general election.

Diefenbaker became the new prime minister and appointed Fleming  to the cabinet as Minister of Finance. As finance minister, Fleming clashed with the governor of the Bank of Canada, James Coyne, over monetary policy and ultimately demanded and got Coyne's resignation in 1961. In 1962, Fleming became the Attorney General of Canada before retiring from politics in 1963.

Fleming returned to politics to seek the PC Party leadership at the 1967 leadership convention for a third time, but came in seventh, and left political life for good.

In later life, he was Governor of the World Bank, an International Monetary Fund official and Chairman of the Bank of Nova Scotia.

Archives 
There is a Donald Methuen Fleming fonds at Library and Archives Canada.

References

External links
 

1905 births
1987 deaths
Canadian Ministers of Finance
Members of the House of Commons of Canada from Ontario
Members of the King's Privy Council for Canada
Members of the United Church of Canada
Progressive Conservative Party of Canada MPs
Lawyers in Ontario
20th-century Canadian lawyers
Progressive Conservative Party of Canada leadership candidates